Judy Bankhead (born 1951) is an American photographer, based in Texas. 

Her work is included in the collections of the Museum of Fine Arts Houston and the 
Tyler Museum of Art.

Bibliography
My Town. Tyler, Texas: Tyler Museum of Art, 1981. 
At the Edge of Town. Victoria, Texas: The Nave Museum, 1985. 
San Antonio Project, 1976-1991. San Antonio, Texas: Southwest Craft Center, 1993.

References

Living people
1951 births
20th-century American photographers
21st-century American photographers
20th-century American women artists
21st-century American women artists